= SCCI (Seychelles) Awards =

SCCI Award
- Awarded for: Excellence in Business (Seychelles)
- Sponsored by: Seychelles Chamber of Commerce and Industry
- Country: Seychelles
- Eligibility: Seychellois Brands or Individuals
- First award: 2013
- Final award: 2023

Television/radio coverage
- Network: SBC

The SCCI (Seychelles) Awards is an annual event that recognizes and celebrates achievements across various sectors in Seychelles. Organized by the Seychelles Chamber of Commerce and Industry (SCCI), the awards focus on promoting innovation, entrepreneurship, and quality in business practices. Established in 2013, the awards have become notable for acknowledging the contributions of individuals and organizations to the economic and social development of the country.
